Langley Vale Wood is one of four First World War Centenary woods created by the Woodland Trust. It is located in Langley Vale, near Epsom, on the North Downs. It consists of 641 acres, including some ancient woodland (120 acres) and open downland. Access is by public right of way and there is currently no parking next to the site.

Parts of the site near Walton-on-the-Hill and Tadworth were used for army training during the First World War and 8,000 troops were billeted here at Tadworth Camp. Nearby Round Wood was used for gas training. Not far away was Woodcote Park Convalescent Camp.

The site was purchased by the Woodland Trust in 2014 and they have since planted about 180,000 trees. It was opened in 2015 by HRH the Princess Royal.

The Woodland Trust have commissioned several installations around the site.

 'The Regiment of Trees' consists of twelve figures carved in Hill House Edge sandstone by Patrick Walls, representing some of the 20,000 volunteers for the 2nd London Division inspected by Lord Kitchener in January 2015 on Epsom Downs. Some of the figures are in uniform with rifles but others are in civilian clothes because there were insufficient uniforms and there were only 100 rifles. The inspection took place during a blizzard.

 'Witness' is a sculpture by John Merrill (2016-2020) using thirty-five massive pieces of oak, inspired by Paul Nash's paintings.  Carved inside the sculpture are excerpts from seven poems written during the war. These are 
'Afterwards' by Margaret Cole, 'May, 1915' by Charlotte Mew, 'The Gift of India' by Sarojini Naidu, 'Futility' by Wilfred Owen, 'Matthew Copse' by Will Streets, 'Lights Out' by Edward Thomas, 'Grodec' by Georg Trakl.

 'Jutland Wood' commemorating the 6,097 sailors who died at the Battle of Jutland. This consists of an avenue of 14 oak porthole markers, one named for each of the British warships sunk, together with the number killed on each, created by Andrew Lapthorn. At one end of the avenue in a boat-shaped area with benches is a steel figure of a sailor by Christine Charlesworth. On the side facing the ancient woodland the sailor is wearing a First World War uniform, while on the other side, facing the newly planted saplings, it wears modern uniform. There is a sapling for every man killed and the groves are named after those awarded the Victoria Cross during the battle.

Also there is the Sainsbury’s Community Orchard with picnic tables, Verdun Oaks grown from descendants of acorns from the battlefield of Verdun, Cherry Avenue with trees bearing boards telling the stories of local soldiers, the carved soldier's bench, and the HMS Paragon memorial seat.

A car park and visitors' centre are planned.

Gallery

References

External links

 Langley Vale Wood
 Map

Epsom
Environment of Surrey
Woodland Trust
Forests and woodlands of Surrey
First World War centenary